The Crownsville Hospital Center was a psychiatric hospital located in Crownsville, Maryland. It was in operation from 1911 until 2004.

History

Background 
Crownsville Hospital Center was enabled by an act of the Maryland General Assembly on April 11, 1910 as the Hospital for the Negro Insane of Maryland. This act also explicitly specified that the facility should not be located in Baltimore. On December 13, 1910, the Board of Managers purchased land which had formerly been farmed for willow and tobacco, located at Crownsville, Maryland, for the sum of $19,000. On May 23, 1910, Dr. Dan Hempeck was designated the first Superintendent.

The facility was founded following a 1908 report of "The Maryland State Lunacy Commission" which stated:

As early as 1899, the Maryland Lunacy Commission stated in its Annual Report:

Again in its 1900 report it stated:

In 1888, an article titled "The Need of An Asylum or Hospital for the Separate Care and Treatment of the Colored Insane of This State" stated three reasons for creating the hospital.  However, five years later, about four hundred black people were still improperly cared for in dark cells, restrained with chains, and sleeping on straw (Bowlin, Lauren).

In chapter 250 of the Laws of Maryland of 1910, an attempt was made to improve the conditions under which the black mentally ill had to live in Maryland (Bowlin, Lauren).

The first group of 12 patients arrived at Crownsville on March 13, 1911. Patients lived in a work camp located in a willow curing house adjacent to one of the willow ponds. Winterode worked with them to prepare roads and to harvest the tobacco and willow crops on the property. Additional patients were transferred in July and September, 1911. Construction started on the first large building, A Building in October 1912. Patients were used to work on the construction of the hospital in addition to working in its day-to-day functions. Men were given manual labored work and women had to knit and mend clothing for staff as well as patients (Osborn, Lawrence). As reported in the State Lunacy Commission Report of December 1912, patients worked as "hod carriers" and assistants to electricians and plumbers. Construction necessitated that they push "barrows of concrete up a tramway three and a half stories in height." They excavated "10000 cubic yards of earth in about 10 weeks." In addition, they unloaded 238 cars of cement, stone, and other building materials. "The laundry work for the patients is done by two adult males and an epileptic imbecile 10 years of age who has been taught to feed the ringer  and at which he has become quite adept. During the past year (1912) these three have washed and ironed over 40,000 pieces."

Need for separate care 
Within a short time smallpox and scarlet fever struck the patients. Water quality was also cited as a problem in those early years. Tuberculosis was a constant threat and is mentioned in the annual reports of those early years because there was no real provision for the isolation of the patients, except in the summer months when there was a temporary open building for them.  The Annual and Biennial Report of the State Lunacy Commission 1914–1915, in the section on Crownsville Hospital, stated that "the percentage of deaths based upon admissions (268 patients) was 38.43. The percentage of deaths calculated upon admissions due to tuberculosis was 29.85. The percentage of deaths based upon average attendance was 32.21." Tuberculosis remained a problem for many years.

It was not until 1939 that the Commissioner of Mental Hygiene announced:  Excluded from this new, active treatment program at the all-white Springfield Hospital Center were the African-American Crownsville TB patients. On October 29, 1915, two hundred Baltimore City patients were transferred from Bayview Medical Center (now Johns Hopkins Bayview Medical Center).

Understaffed, overcrowded 
There were two physicians in 1920, including the superintendent, with a patient census of 521.  There were also 17 nurses and attendants, one social worker, and 18 other help. The data from the 1920 U.S. Census report has the average age of Crownsville patients at 42 years. The youngest was 14 years and there were three patients in their eighties. In the occupations' section of the report, 68% were listed as holding hospital job assignments.  Therapies initially included hydrotherapy and sedatives. In the 1930s, insulin shock was introduced. Malaria treatment was begun in 1942, in which patients were infected with malaria pathogens. As many as twenty patients at a time were inoculated. According to the 1948 Annual Report, Crownsville had about 1,800 patients, of which 103 patients received shock treatments, 56 patients received malaria/penicillin treatments, and 33 received a lobotomy.

Lobotomies were a common procedure during those years, but Crownsville Superintendent Dr. Morgenstern was opposed to them. In his 1950 Annual Report, he said that Crownsville has "very few lobotomies". He also expressed his opposition to the trend "to rely upon this operation to make the institutional case more manageable". In a report of March 1954, the Superintendent stated that lobotomies were not being done.

According to a January 1947 report on medical care in Maryland, the normal occupancy of private and public mental hospital beds was 7,453. Of these, only Crownsville had African American patients in its 1,044 occupied beds as of August 1946. Hospital conditions deteriorated markedly in the 1940s due to overcrowding and staff shortages. The staffing of the wards was very inadequate during the period of World War II. Financial support hurt asylums because most were philanthropies, but costs to operate them were high (Osborn, Lawrence). The Commissioner of Mental Hygiene said in a letter of May 22, 1945 to the State's Governor: "A few nights ago at Crownsville in the division which houses ninety criminal, insane men there was one employee on duty."

A "Confidential Report to the Board of Mental Hygiene in Regard to Present Conditions in State Hospitals" (November 14, 1944) stated that Crownsville was 30-percent over its capacity, in contrast to the two large hospitals for white patients which were 11.6-percent and 11-percent over capacity. That same report documented that, for the preceding five-year period, the average number of deaths per 1,000 patients was 102 at Crownsville, in contrast to 59 and 60 for the two large hospitals serving white patients. The report also mentioned a problem relating to the availability of clothes for the "feebleminded" patients of Crownsville: "Some serious problems relating to supplies have occurred so that on one recent occasion some 25 patients in the Division for the "Feebleminded" were found on inspection to be completely without clothes."

Deteriorating conditions 
A visitor to the Division for the Feebleminded at Crownsville described his experiences in a memo of November 2, 1944 to the Commissioner of Mental Hygiene (Dr. Preston). After praising the appearance of the girls' ward, he described the boys' ward as follows:

The Baltimore Suns articles on Maryland's mental health system were published in 1948–1949 under the title "MARYLAND'S SHAME". Following are statements from the articles relating to Crownsville:

In 1929 there were 55 discharges from Crownsville but 92 deaths. The census began to rise dramatically, until it peaked in 1955 at 2,719 patients. The staff of Crownsville Hospital had been all white until 1948.

Integration 
Through the 1940s, the NAACP had advocated hiring African-American staff but encountered resistance from the Commissioner of Mental Hygiene. Finally, in 1948, the new superintendent of Crownsville hired the first African-American staff member Vernon Sparks, in the Psychology Department. Gwendolyn Lee was hired later in the Social Work Department. The Crownsville Superintendent still was not permitted to hire African-American staff in direct-care positions. This did not happen until 1952. By 1959, 45-percent of Crownsville's staff was African-American, in contrast to 6- to 8-percent in the other large state mental hospitals.

The adolescent patient population was integrated in 1962 and the adult population in 1963. An earlier integration attempt had been made in December 1954 when the Crownsville Superintendent transferred 15 children ages 2–6 years from Crownsville to the all-white Rosewood State Training School. The Superintendent of Crownsville was threatened with a reprimand by the Commissioner of Mental Health and resigned the next year (1955).

Unpaid labor 
Industrial therapy (unpaid work) was an important part of life at Crownsville. In the spring of 1958, more than 600 patients had work assignments in more than 55 placements, which included "dental assistant," "receptionist," "librarian," and "hospital aide."  Work was considered to be part of therapy, and "patients unable or unwilling to participate were considered too ill to enjoy the privilege of freedom of the grounds." Staff shortages were always a problem.

In 1953, Superintendent Dr. Eichert reported that in "A" Building there were 560 patients and four attendants in the evening and four in the day. The Baltimore Sun of June 1953 gives a description of the "old ward for highly disturbed women": "Here are truly the creatures of the dark. The sickest ones are kept in a room as forbidding as a dungeon, where they live in a state of odorous untidiness, many of them refusing to wear clothes.  Twice a day a bucket and two cups are brought to the door, to give the inmates a drink. There are 78 patients here and 28 beds. These and other patients on the same floor – a total of 96 – have the use of three toilets, three wash basins and one tub. They cannot be bathed daily because it was explained, hot water is not available every day."

The Baltimore City Grand Jury Report for Fall 1955 reported that: "This committee was shocked at the lack of professional personnel at Crownsville. On one ward, which consists of 76 geriatric patients, there is either one registered nurse or an attendant on duty at a time. Many of these patients must be spoon fed... The Patients who are well enough help feed those who are less fortunate than themselves."  In the pediatrics section of the Winterode Building for the feebleminded, there are 38 children including spastics, hydrocephalics and microcephalics. These children require expert nursing care but on our visit to this section there was one registered nurse on duty. It is necessary to have several female patients assist in the care of these children."

In a letter to the Maryland Governor of June 23, 1952, the Chairman of the Mental Hygiene Board of Review asked:

In a letter to a Johns Hopkins Hospital social worker of December 3, 1956, Dr. Ralph Meng, the Crownsville Superintendent, expressed his concern that community agencies were not willing to accept their responsibilities in providing services to discharged Crownsville patients. He said:

Elsie Lacks (born Lucille Elsie Pleasant) was the second-born and eldest daughter of Henrietta Lacks, who was the source of the famous HeLa cell line. Elsie was institutionalized here for epilepsy until she died in 1955 at the age of 15.

First black superintendent 
In 1964, Dr. George McKenzie Phillips was appointed, the first African-American superintendent. Dr. Phillips established a day treatment program and a school mental health outreach program, in addition to supporting the mental health clinics in Baltimore and the Southern Maryland Counties. Patients in Crownsville clinics were given free medication. Training programs were established in psychiatry, psychology, social work, dance therapy, and pastoral counseling. Crownsville had an active foreign students' program for those in medicine, social work, and psychology. In the ten years prior to its closing, it hosted students from Israel, Ireland, Spain, Germany, Turkey, and Chile. The Hospital also trained Spanish speaking therapists when that need was identified.

The hospital staff was well known for its outspoken resistance to the pressures to place patients in public shelters, with the resulting "dumping" of patients onto the streets and into the jails. Improvements in psychiatric treatment, rigid admission policies, and better funding of outpatient treatment and residential services resulted in the hospital's census declining from 2,719 in 1955 to 200 patients by the year 2000 and zero soon after.

The hospital grounds became the central county site for many social, school, and health programs, and the hospital finally closed in July 2004. Those patients in need of further psychiatric hospitalization were transferred to two of Maryland's remaining hospitals. Its original buildings are still standing and today portions of the campus are occupied by various tenants.

The site is also the location of Crownsville Hospital's patient cemetery. This historic site was rededicated in 2004. Approximately 1,600 patients are buried in graves marked by numbers only, with the more recent having patient names.

Information on Crownsville Hospital can be found in the Maryland State Archives Collections, which contain reference materials from the Hospital, the Auxiliary, Paul Lurz, and Doris Morgenstern Wachsler.

Property development 

The State of Maryland is examining possible uses for the property. A number of different development models are being proposed as follows.

Crownsville Community Campus 
CSCC's project is called the Crownsville Community Campus with a mission as follows:

CSCC seeks to restore the outer facades of the existing buildings while renovating their interiors to accommodate tenants. The project does not involve developing green-space or former hospital space into standardized housing. CSCC's model is a self sustaining one that involves granting excess revenue, mostly rental income, back to non-profits (primarily those that operate on site). The Crownsville Community Campus project is designed as the catalyst for an Altruistic Economic Cluster – an economic model revolving around helping others. Additionally, special attention has been given to traffic and security concerns. Their plan also involves funding to enhance and access historic, community, and green resources associated with the site. Bob Pascal had been associated with CSCC's plan as a funding partner and potential tenant.

See also
Petersburg State Colony for the Negro Insane

References

Citations

General sources 
 Bowlin, Lauren. "Maryland Historical Trust NR-Eligibility Review Form".  Crownsville Hospital Center Complex-Maryland State Archives.maryland.gov,n.d.Web.  30 Sep. 2013.  <Crownsville Hospital Center Complex-Maryland State Archives>.
 Osborn, Lawrence A. "From Beauty to Despair: The Rise and Fall of the American State Mental Hospital." The Psychiatric Quarterly 80(4) (2009): 219-31. Dec. 2009. Web. 1 Oct. 2013.
 Stuckey, Zosha. "Race, Apology and Public Memory at MD Hospital for Negro Insane." Disability Studies Quarterly Vol 30 (1), 2017. (On Line Journal)

Primary sources referenced in this article, unless otherwise noted with in-line citations:

 
 Reports of The Maryland State Lunacy Commission in the Maryland State Archives in Annapolis, Maryland.
 "Materials Towards a History of Crownsville" in a collection donated by Doris Morgenstern Wachsler located at the Maryland State Archives.

External links 
 Crownsville Hospital Center 2017 Interior and Exterior Photographs of Crownsville State Hospital
 Crownsville Hospital, photographs at Forgotten Photography.
 Historic photos of Maryland Lunatic Asylums 1908–1910, from the Maryland State Archives.
 Photographic Archives of Maryland, search on Historic Photos of "Crownsville State Hospital" for pictures of the hospital. Maryland State Archives.
 Crownsville Hospital's patient cemetery at Find a Grave.
 "Separate and Unequal: The Legacy of Racially Segregated Psychiatric Hospitals...", by Vanessa Jackson.
 "Studying a Relic of a Painful Past",
 
 Documentary film, Crownsville Hospital: From Lunacy to Legacy Website

Hospital buildings completed in 1911
Defunct hospitals in Maryland
Psychiatric hospitals in Maryland
Buildings and structures in Anne Arundel County, Maryland
2004 disestablishments in Maryland
Hospitals disestablished in 2004
1911 establishments in Maryland
African-American history of Maryland
Health policy in the United States
Race and health in the United States
Unfree labor in the United States